Agnes Ayres (born Agnes Henkel; April 4, 1892  – December 25, 1940) was an American actress who rose to fame during the period of silent films. She was known for her role as Lady Diana Mayo in The Sheik opposite Rudolph Valentino.

Career
Ayres began her career in 1914 when she was noticed by an Essanay Studios staff director and cast as an extra in a crowd scene. After moving to Manhattan with her mother to pursue a career in acting, Ayres was spotted by actress Alice Joyce. Joyce noticed the physical resemblance the two shared which eventually led to Ayres being cast in Richard the Brazen (1917), as Joyce's character's sister. Ayres' career began to gain momentum when Paramount Pictures founder Jesse Lasky began to take an interest in her. Lasky gave her a starring role in the drama Held by the Enemy (1920), and he lobbied for parts for her in several productions by Cecil B. DeMille. During this period Ayres began a romance with Lasky.

In 1921, Ayres shot to stardom when she was cast as Lady Diana Mayo, an English heiress, with "Latin lover" Rudolph Valentino in The Sheik. Ayres later reprised her role as Lady Diana in the 1926 sequel The Son of the Sheik. Following the release of The Sheik, she had major roles in many other films, including The Affairs of Anatol (1921) starring Wallace Reid, Forbidden Fruit (1921), and Cecil B. DeMille's The Ten Commandments (1923).

By 1923, Ayres' career began to wane following the end of her relationship with Jesse Lasky. She married Mexican diplomat S. Manuel Reachi in 1924. The couple had a daughter, then divorced in 1927.

Ayres lost her fortune and real estate holdings in the Wall Street Crash of 1929. That same year, she also appeared in her last major role in The Donovan Affair, starring Jack Holt. To earn money, she left acting and played the vaudeville circuit. She returned to acting in 1936, confident that she could make a comeback — but, unable to secure starring roles, and somewhat overweight, Ayres appeared in mostly uncredited parts and finally retired from acting in 1937.

Later years and death
After her retirement, Ayres became despondent and was eventually committed to a sanatorium. In 1939, she also lost custody of her daughter to Reachi.

She died from a cerebral hemorrhage on December 25, 1940, at her home in Hollywood, California at the age of 48; she had been ill for several weeks. She is interred at Hollywood Forever Cemetery. In 1960, Ayres was inducted into the Hollywood Walk of Fame with a motion pictures star at 6504 Hollywood Boulevard for her contributions to the film industry.

Her daughter Maria Reachi had a small part in the movie East Side, West Side (1949).

Selected filmography

Further reading

References

External links

 
Photographs and literature at Virtual History

Actresses from Illinois
American silent film actresses
American film actresses
Burials at Hollywood Forever Cemetery
People from Carbondale, Illinois
Vaudeville performers
1892 births
1940 deaths
20th-century American actresses